Thomas Lanier Clingman (July 27, 1812November 3, 1897), known as the "Prince of Politicians," was a Democratic member of the United States House of Representatives from 1843 to 1845 and from 1847 to 1858, and U.S. senator from the state of North Carolina between 1858 and 1861. During the Civil War he refused to resign his Senate seat and was one of ten senators expelled from the Senate in absentia. He then served as a general in the Confederate States Army.

Early life 
Clingman, was born in Huntsville, a small community in present-day Yadkin County, North Carolina. His parents were Jacob and Jane Poindexter Clingman and he was named for Dr. Thomas Lanier, his half uncle. He was educated by private tutors and in the public schools in Iredell County, NC. Clingman graduated from the University of North Carolina in 1832, where he was a member of the Dialectic Senate of the Dialectic and Philanthropic Societies. He then studied law and was admitted to the bar in 1834 and began practice in Huntsville.

Political career 

Clingman was elected to the North Carolina State House of Commons in 1835. In 1836 he moved to Asheville, North Carolina. He was a member of the North Carolina State Senate in 1840. In 1843 Clingman ran as a Whig and was elected to the 28th United States Congress, however he was defeated in his reelection bid in 1845. In 1845 he fought a duel with a fellow congressman William Lowndes Yancey of Alabama. In Yancey's maiden speech on the House floor, he had impugned his opponent's integrity. Both duelists had missed. In 1847 he regained the seat and won reelection in 1849, 1851, 1853, 1855 and 1857. On May 7, 1858, he resigned after becoming a United States senator as a Democrat the previous day, replacing the resigning Asa Biggs. He was reelected but was expelled from the Senate for support of the Confederacy.

Civil War 
When he first entered the War, Clingman was the commander of the 25th North Carolina Infantry and took part in the Peninsula Campaign. He later commanded a brigade of infantry. Clingman's Brigade consisted of the 8th, 31st, 51st and 61st North Carolina Infantry. Clingman's Brigade fought at Goldsboro, Battery Wagner, Drewry's Bluff, Cold Harbor, Petersburg, Globe Tavern, Fort Fisher, and Bentonville.

Post-war career 
After the Civil War, Clingman explored and measured mountains in western North Carolina and Tennessee. Tennessee's highest mountain, also partly in North Carolina, was named Clingman's Dome in his honor. He died in Morganton, North Carolina, and was buried in the Riverside Cemetery in Asheville, North Carolina.

See also
 List of American Civil War generals (Confederate)
 List of United States senators expelled or censured

References

Further reading 
 Eicher, John H., and David J. Eicher, Civil War High Commands. Stanford: Stanford University Press, 2001. .
 Sifakis, Stewart. Who Was Who in the Civil War. New York: Facts On File, 1988. .
 Warner, Ezra J. Generals in Gray: Lives of the Confederate Commanders. Baton Rouge: Louisiana State University Press, 1959. .
 Jeffrey, Thomas E., “Thomas Lanier Clingman: Fire Eater from the Carolina Mountains”

External links 

 

 
 

|-

|-

|-

|-

1812 births
1897 deaths
19th-century American politicians
American duellists
Confederate States Army brigadier generals
Democratic Party members of the United States House of Representatives from North Carolina
Democratic Party United States senators from North Carolina
Expelled United States senators
North Carolina Whigs
People from Yadkin County, North Carolina
People of North Carolina in the American Civil War
Whig Party members of the United States House of Representatives